Cieran Peter Slicker (born 15 September 2002) is a professional footballer who plays as a goalkeeper for Premier League side Manchester City. Born in England, he is a youth international for Scotland, and has been capped at U17, U18 and U21 level. He has previously spent time on loan with Rochdale.

Club career

Manchester City
Born in Oldham, Slicker played youth football with Manchester City. He made his professional debut for the clubs Under 21 team in an EFL Trophy draw against Lincoln City on 17 November 2020.

On 15 November 2021, Slicker was named as a substitute for the first team in a 6-3 victory over RB Leipzig in the UEFA Champions League. Pep Guardiola has also named him as his substitute on five occasions in both League and Cup during the 2021–22 season.

Rochdale (loan)
In July 2022 Slicker signed for EFL League Two side Rochdale on loan for the 2022–23 season. He made his Rochdale debut on 9 August 2022 in the clubs 2-0 victory over Burton Albion in the EFL Cup.

On 11 January 2023, Slicker was recalled by Manchester City, having made three appearances for Rochdale, two in the EFL Cup and one in the EFL Trophy.

International career
Slicker is a Scottish youth international.

References

2002 births
Living people
English people of Scottish descent
Footballers from Oldham
Scottish footballers
English footballers
Association football goalkeepers
Scotland youth international footballers
Scotland under-21 international footballers
Manchester City F.C. players
Rochdale A.F.C. players